The Toyota IMV platform is an automobile platform for SUVs, pickups/light trucks and passenger cars from Toyota. The name "IMV" stands for "Innovative International Multi-purpose Vehicle". It uses a ladder frame chassis construction.

IMV platform-based vehicles are either rear-wheel drive or four-wheel drive (can be either full-time or rear-based part-time). The front suspension is independent double-wishbone, while the rear suspension is half-dependent. Engines are mounted longitudinally.

History 
The IMV Project was first announced by Toyota in 2002. The project aimed to develop and produce pickup trucks, a minivan and an SUV outside Japan to reduce costs. The vehicles were released in 2004 as the seventh-generation Hilux, first-generation Innova and first-generation Fortuner respectively.

Initial production of IMV vehicles were centered in Thailand, Indonesia, Argentina and South Africa, which would supply vehicles to countries in Asia, Europe, Africa, Oceania, Latin America and the Middle East in a complete form or by knock-down kits. The production of major components were divided, for example diesel engine production were centered in Thailand, petrol engines in Indonesia and manual transmissions in the Philippines and India.

Cumulative sales reached 1 million vehicles in 2006, 2 million in 2008, 3 million in 2009, 4 million in 2010, and 5 million in March 2012.

Applications 
 Toyota Hilux
 AN10/AN20/AN30 (2004–2015, also referred to as "IMV1"/"IMV2"/"IMV3")
 AN120/AN130 (2015–present)
 Toyota Fortuner/SW4/Hilux SW4
 AN50/AN60 (2005–2015, also referred to as "IMV4")
 AN150/AN160 (2015–present)
 Toyota Innova/Kijang Innova
 AN40 (2004–2015, also referred to as "IMV5")
 AN140 (2015–present)

IMV 0 

The IMV 0 is a single-cab pickup concept that was presented on 14 December 2022 in Thailand based on the IMV platform. It was designed and engineered by Toyota Daihatsu Engineering & Manufacturing (TDEM) in collaboration with Japanese and Australian engineering team. It is expected to be powered by a 2.4-litre 2GD-FTV diesel engine, and will be produced in 2023.

References 

IMV